"On the Turning Away" is a song from Pink Floyd's 1987 album, A Momentary Lapse of Reason.
The song was a staple of live shows from the 1987–89 world tours in support of A Momentary Lapse of Reason and was one of the songs in rotation during the 1994 tour in support of The Division Bell. The song was resurrected by David Gilmour on his 2006 On an Island Tour for one night only. Live recordings exist on Delicate Sound of Thunder (1988) and Live in Gdańsk (2008).

Music and lyrics
The song has often been described as a protest song and is one of the more political tracks Pink Floyd released after the departure of Roger Waters. The main concept came from Anthony Moore, but David Gilmour has stated that he re-wrote the last verse of both "On the Turning Away" and "Learning to Fly". Musically, it has been called a power ballad. Bassist Guy Pratt has said about its musical structure (referring to the fact that he had to guide Phil Manzanera and Steve DiStanislao through a completely unplanned performance of it in 2006): "The song only has five chords in it, but they don't necessarily show up where you think they will."

It has also been noted for being one of Pink Floyd's rhythmically most complex songs, constantly alternating between various time signatures. Some reviewers have described it as Celtic sounding.

Release
Released as the second single from the album, it reached number one on the Billboard Album Rock Tracks chart in early 1988. In the United Kingdom, the song charted at number 55 on the UK Singles Chart.

Song charted at 47 in the Netherlands, and 34 in New Zealand 

Cash Box, referring to Waters' departure and Gilmour taking over the songwriting duties, said that "Atlas shrugged, and the results are stunning" and that the song "is filled with apocalyptic imagery and roughhewn rock foundations that Floyd fans crave."

Video
The music video for the track featured a live recording and concert footage filmed during the band's three night run at The Omni in Atlanta, Georgia in November 1987 directed by Lawrence Jordan (who has directed concert films for Rush, Mariah Carey, and Billy Joel). Promotional videos for "The Dogs of War" and "One Slip" also used footage of this concert. The video made it to number nine on MTV's Video Countdown in January 1988.

Personnel

Studio
Pink Floyd
David Gilmour –  lead and backing vocals, electric & acoustic guitars

Additional musicians:
Richard Wright – Hammond organ, backing vocals
Jon Carin – synthesizer
Tony Levin – bass guitar
Jim Keltner – drums
Darlene Koldenhoven (as Darlene Koldenhaven) – backing vocals
Carmen Twillie – backing vocals
Phyllis St. James – backing vocals
Donny Gerrard – backing vocals

Live Personnel 1987–1994

David Gilmour – lead vocals, lead guitar
Nick Mason – drums
Richard Wright – keyboards, backing vocals

Additional musicians:

Jon Carin – synthesisers, backing vocals
Guy Pratt – fretless bass guitar, backing vocals
Tim Renwick – acoustic guitar, backing vocals
Gary Wallis – percussion, drums (on the 1992 Amnesty International Big 30 concert and together with Nick Mason on the  1994 The Division Bell tour)
Durga McBroom, Rachel Fury, Margaret Taylor – backing vocals (1987-1989)
Sam Brown, Durga McBroom, Claudia Fontaine – backing vocals (1994)

David Gilmour Live 2006
David Gilmour – lead vocals, rhythm guitar, lead guitar
Richard Wright – organ, backing vocals
Guy Pratt – bass guitar, backing vocals
Steve DiStanislao – drums
Phil Manzanera - acoustic guitar
Jon Carin – synthesisers

Covers
Richie Havens performed the song live (as the encore) during his 1998 tour. Progressive metal band Oceans of Slumber covered the song on their 2015 EP, Blue.

References

Pink Floyd songs
1987 singles
1980s ballads
Protest songs
Songs about poverty
Hard rock ballads
Folk rock songs
Songs written by David Gilmour
Songs written by Anthony Moore
Song recordings produced by Bob Ezrin
Song recordings produced by David Gilmour
Columbia Records singles
EMI Records singles